Senate elections were held in Kazakhstan on 12 August 2020. All 17 of the 49 seats were up for reelection including the newly created represented seat from the city of Shymkent. 2889 out of total 3069 members of the Mäslihats cast their vote for a Senator representing each region and three municipal cities.

Electoral system 
The members of the Senate of Kazakhstan are nonpartisan and are indirectly elected by the local legislative bodies Maslihats every six years. Each of the fourteen region and city of "republican significance" (Almaty, Astana, and Shymkent) are represented by two senators, renewed by half every three years, while 15 senators are appointed by the President of Kazakhstan.

Results

National

Akmola Region

Aktobe Region

Almaty

Almaty Region

Atyrau Region

East Kazakhstan Region

Jambyl Region

Karaganda Region

Kostanay Region

Kyzylorda Region

Mangystau Region

North Kazakhstan Region

Nur-Sultan

Pavlodar Region

Shymkent

Turkistan Region

West Kazakhstan Region

References 

Kazakhstan
Elections in Kazakhstan
2020 in Kazakhstan
August 2020 events in Kazakhstan